Heru Budi Hartono (born 13 December 1965) is an Indonesian bureaucrat who has been the acting Governor of Jakarta since 2022 and Head of the Presidential Secretariat since 2017. He was the former Head of Jakarta Regional Asset Financial Management Agency under Governor Basuki Tjahaja Purnama between 2015 and 2017. A former mayor of North Jakarta, Heru was appointed by Governor Basuki to be a candidate for deputy governor in the 2017 Jakarta Regional Head Elections if he only advanced through an independent path. He is currently the acting Governor of Jakarta replacing Anies Baswedan's position since 17 October 2022, until 2024 Jakarta election.

Early life and education 
Heru was born on 13 December 1965 in Kolang, North Sumatra. Heru started his education at the Central Jakarta State Elementary School no. 8. He studied there until the 3rd grade. He later moved to Pakistan along with his parents, where he finished his elementary education there. Heru returned to Jakarta in 1977 and continued his education at the PSKD Junior High School, a Christian-based highschool in Central Jakarta. Upon graduating from PSKD Junior High School, he moved again to the Netherlands and pursued his high school education there until 1984.

Heru returned to Indonesia after finishing his high school education and studied economics in the Krisnadwipayana University. He graduated from the university in 1990 with a bachelor's degree in economics. He attended a course on taxation held by the Artha Bhakti Foundation before entering civil service. Several years later, in 1995, Heru returned to the university to pursue postgraduate studies in management. He later earned a postgraduate degree in management from the university in 1998.

Bureaucratic career

North Jakarta and Jakarta regional government 
Heru started his career at the North Jakarta's city government in 1993, where he served as a special staff to the mayor. He was later moved to the city's program planning bureau in 1995. During this period, Heru was instructed to study general administration in a training program held by the city's education and training bureau. He also attended courses held for civil servants by the Institute of Economic and Community Research, the think tank of the Faculty of Economics of the University of Indonesia.

In 1999, Heru was promoted to head the city government's reporting control subsection. He held this position until 2002. In the following years, he was rotated to several different positions in the North Jakarta city government, such as the head of the facilities and infrastructure subsection from 2002 until 2007, head of the general section from 2007 until 2008, and head of the urban facilities administration section from 2008 until 2013. During his tenure as the latter, Heru was involved in the eviction of the BMW city park residents, who were establishing squatter settlements in the area. The provincial Jakarta government later constructed 900 meters of fence around the garden to prevent squatters from inhabiting the park.

After several years of working in the North Jakarta city government, Heru was promoted to serve in the provincial government. Heru was appointed by the-then Governor of Jakarta, Joko Widodo, as the head of the province's regional head and international cooperation, on 14 February 2013. During this period, Heru proposed a ban on the use of personal vehicles every Sunday of the first week of the month for chiefs of provincial and municipal agencies. He set an example himself by using bus, angkot, and bajaj instead of state-provided cars to go to work in the city hall. The ban was later implemented through a gubernatorial instruction enacted in late 2013.

Mayor of North Jakarta 
After a year serving in the provincial government, Heru was appointed as the Mayor of North Jakarta, with his inauguration being held at the BMW city park on 12 January 2014.

Governor of Jakarta 
After Anies completed his term of office, Heru took over as acting governor on 17 October 2022. As acting governor, one of Heru's top priorities is to mitigate flooding in Jakarta. To do so, he resumed the dredging process left by his predecessor, focusing on reclamation near the coast, expanding pumps throughout Jakarta to reduce the severity of flooding, and continuing the normalisation of the Ciliwung river. Another one of Heru's main goals as governor is to eradicate extreme poverty in Jakarta by 2024 by strengthening economic and basic public services.

On March 3, 2023, the provincial government budgeted a Rp 2.3 billion jeep for Heru which underwent public scrutiny. Heru claims that he wasn't aware and will "check later". According to him, he was only aware of the city's plan to purchase electric vehicles for public officials. On the 13th of March, Heru stated that he won't change his car, a Kijang, to a jeep.

References 

1965 births
Living people
Indonesian Muslims
Governors of Jakarta
Indonesian civil servants
Mayors and regents of places in Jakarta
People from North Sumatra
Mayors of places in Indonesia